Krasilnikoviella flava is a Gram-positive and non-spore-forming bacterium from the genus Krasilnikoviella which has been isolated from sediments from the Baltic Sea at the Kiel Bay in Germany.

References 

Micrococcales
Bacteria described in 2009